Maria Lawrence (born 20 September 1970) is a retired female English racing cyclist.

Cycling career
Lawrence represented Great Britain at the 1996 Summer Olympics in Atlanta, Georgia.

She represented England and won a bronze medal in the team time trial event, at the 1994 Commonwealth Games in Victoria, British Columbia, Canada. Four years later she represented England in the road race event, at the 1998 Commonwealth Games in Kuala Lumpur, Malaysia.

Personal life
She is married to another cyclist, Dominic Sweeney.

Palmarès
1994
3rd Time Trial, Commonwealth Games
1996
1st  British National Road Race Championships
1997
1st  British National Road Race Championships

References

1970 births
Living people
British cycling road race champions
English female cyclists
Cyclists at the 1994 Commonwealth Games
Cyclists at the 1998 Commonwealth Games
People from Market Harborough
Sportspeople from Leicestershire
Commonwealth Games medallists in cycling
Commonwealth Games bronze medallists for England
Cyclists at the 1996 Summer Olympics
Olympic cyclists of Great Britain
Medallists at the 1994 Commonwealth Games